The Legend of Zelda: Ocarina of Time is an action-adventure game developed and published by Nintendo for the Nintendo 64. It was released in Japan and North America in November 1998 and in PAL regions the following month. Ocarina of Time is the first game in The Legend of Zelda series with 3D graphics.

The game was developed by Nintendo EAD, led by five directors including Eiji Aonuma and Yoshiaki Koizumi, produced by series co-creator Shigeru Miyamoto, and written by Kensuke Tanabe. Veteran Zelda series composer Koji Kondo created the musical score. The player controls Link in the fantasy land of Hyrule on a quest to stop the evil king Ganondorf, by traveling through time and navigating dungeons and an overworld. The game introduced features such as a target-lock system and context-sensitive buttons that have since become common in 3D adventure games. The player must learn to play numerous songs on an ocarina to progress.

Ocarina of Time received acclaim from critics and consumers and won several awards and accolades, who praised its visuals, sound, gameplay, soundtrack, and writing. It has been ranked by numerous publications as the greatest video game of all time and is the highest-rated game of all time on the review aggregator Metacritic. It was commercially successful, with more than seven million copies sold worldwide. In the United States, it received more than three times more pre-orders than any other game at the time.

A direct sequel, The Legend of Zelda: Majora's Mask, was released in 2000. Ocarina of Time has been re-released on every one of Nintendo's home consoles since and on the iQue Player in China. An enhanced version of the game for the Nintendo 3DS, The Legend of Zelda: Ocarina of Time 3D, was released in 2011. Master Quest, an alternative version of the game including new puzzles and increased difficulty, is included in one of the GameCube releases and the 3D version.

Gameplay 

The Legend of Zelda: Ocarina of Time is a fantasy action-adventure game set in an expansive environment. The player controls series protagonist Link from a third-person perspective in a three-dimensional world. Link primarily fights with a sword and shield but can also use other weapons such as projectiles, bombs, and magic spells. The control scheme introduced techniques such as context-sensitive actions and a targeting system called "Z-targeting", which allows the player to have Link focus and latch onto enemies or other objects. When using this technique, the camera follows the target and Link constantly faces it. Projectile attacks are automatically directed at the target and do not require manual aiming. Context-sensitive actions allow multiple tasks to be assigned to one button, simplifying the control scheme. The on-screen display shows what will happen when the button is pushed and changes depending on what the character is doing. For example, the same button that causes Link to push a box if he is standing next to it will have him climb on the box if the analog stick is pushed toward it. Much of the game is spent in battle, but some parts require the use of stealth.

Link gains abilities by collecting items and weapons found in dungeons or in the overworld, including several optional side quests and minor objectives. Side quest rewards include new weapons or abilities. In one side quest, Link trades items he cannot use among non-player characters. This trading sequence features ten items and ends with Link receiving an item he can use, the two-handed Biggoron Sword, the strongest sword in the game. In another side quest, Link can acquire a horse. This allows him to travel faster but attacking while riding is restricted to arrows.

Link is given an ocarina near the beginning of the game, which is later replaced by the Ocarina of Time. Throughout the game, Link learns twelve melodies that allow him to solve music-based puzzles and teleport to previously visited locations. The Ocarina of Time is also used to claim the Master Sword in the Temple of Time. When Link takes the sword, he is transported seven years into the future and becomes an adult. Young Link and adult Link have different abilities. For example, only adult Link can use the Fairy Bow, and only young Link can fit through certain small passages. After completing certain tasks, Link can travel freely between the two time periods by replacing and taking the sword.

Plot

Setting

Ocarina of Time is set in the fictional kingdom of Hyrule, the setting of most Legend of Zelda games. Hyrule Field serves as the central hub connected to several outlying areas with diverse topography and the races of Hyrule.

Story
The fairy Navi awakens Link from a nightmare in which he witnesses a man in black armor pursuing a young girl on horseback. Navi brings Link to the Great Deku Tree, who is cursed and near death. The Deku Tree tells Link that a "wicked man of the desert" cursed him and seeks to conquer the world and that Link must stop him. Before dying, the Great Deku Tree gives Link the Spiritual Stone of the Forest and sends him to Hyrule Castle to speak with Hyrule's princess.

At the Hyrule Castle garden, Link meets Princess Zelda, who believes Ganondorf, the evil Gerudo king, is seeking the Triforce, a holy relic that gives its holder godlike power. Zelda asks Link to obtain the three Spiritual Stones so he can enter the Sacred Realm and claim the Triforce before Ganondorf reaches it. Link collects the other two stones: the first from Darunia, leader of the Gorons, and the second from Ruto, princess of the Zoras. Link returns to Hyrule Castle, where he sees Ganondorf chase Zelda and her caretaker Impa on horseback, like in his nightmare, and unsuccessfully attempts to stop him. Inside the Temple of Time, he uses the Ocarina of Time, a gift from Zelda, and the Spiritual Stones to open the door to the Sacred Realm. There he finds the Master Sword, but as he pulls it from its pedestal he is incapacitated and Ganondorf, having snuck into the Temple after Link, appears and claims the Triforce.

Seven years later, an older Link awakens in the Sacred Realm and is met by Rauru, one of the seven Sages who protects the entrance to the Sacred Realm. Rauru explains that Link's spirit was sealed for seven years until he was old enough to wield the Master Sword and defeat Ganondorf, who has now taken over Hyrule. The seven sages can imprison Ganondorf in the Sacred Realm, but five are unaware of their identities as sages. Link is returned to the Temple of Time, where he meets the mysterious Sheik, who guides him to free five temples from Ganondorf's control and allow each temple's sage to awaken. Link befriended all five sages as a child: his childhood friend Saria, the Sage of the Forest Temple; Darunia, the Sage of the Fire Temple; Ruto, the Sage of the Water Temple; Impa, the Sage of the Shadow Temple; and Nabooru, leader of the Gerudos in Ganondorf's absence, the Sage of the Spirit Temple. After the five sages awaken, Sheik reveals herself to be Zelda in disguise, as well as the seventh sage. She tells Link that Ganondorf's heart was unbalanced, causing the Triforce to split into three pieces. Ganondorf acquired only the Triforce of Power, while Zelda received the Triforce of Wisdom and Link the Triforce of Courage.

Ganondorf appears and captures Zelda, imprisoning her in his castle. The other six sages help Link infiltrate the stronghold; Link frees Zelda after defeating Ganondorf, who destroys the castle in an attempt to kill Link and Zelda. After they escape the collapsing castle, Ganondorf emerges from the rubble and transforms into a boar-like beast named Ganon using the Triforce of Power, knocking the Master Sword from Link's hand; with Zelda's aid, Link retrieves the Master Sword and defeats Ganon. The seven sages seal Ganondorf in the Dark Realm; still holding the Triforce of Power, he vows to take revenge on their descendants. Zelda uses the Ocarina of Time to send Link back to his childhood. Navi departs and young Link meets Zelda in the castle garden once more, where he retains knowledge of Hyrule's fate, starting with Hyrule's decline.

Development 

Ocarina of Time was developed concurrently with Super Mario 64 and Mario Kart 64 for the Nintendo 64 by Nintendo's Entertainment Analysis & Development (EAD) division, for more than $12 million with a staff of more than 200.

Development was migrated from the 64DD disk drive peripheral to cartridge due to the high data throughput of streaming 500 motion-captured character animations throughout gameplay. Initially targeting 16-megabytes, it was increased to 32 megabytes, as Nintendo's largest game ever. Early in development, the team had concerns about the data storage constraints of the cartridge; in the worst-case scenario, Ocarina of Time would follow a similar structure to Super Mario 64, with Link restricted to Ganondorf's castle as a central hub, using a portal system similar to the paintings that Mario uses to traverse the realm. An idea that arose from this stage of development, a battle with a doppelganger of Ganondorf that rides through paintings, was used as the boss of the Forest Temple dungeon.

While series co-creator Shigeru Miyamoto had been the principal director and producer of Super Mario 64, he was involved in the game's production and now in charge of five directors by acting as a producer and supervisor of Ocarina of Time. Different parts were handled by different directors, a new strategy for Nintendo EAD. Four or five initial teams grew over time, each working on different basic experiments, including scenario and planning, Link's actions, transforming classic 2D items into improved 3D form, camera experiments, motion capture, sound, special effects, and the flow of time.

Although the development team was new to 3D games, assistant director Makoto Miyanaga recalled a "passion for creating something new and unprecedented". Despite the setting being a "medieval tale of sword and sorcery", Miyamoto used the chanbara (samurai) genre of Japanese sword fighting as a model for the game's combat and was content with the positive worldwide reception. The development involved more than 120 people, including stunt performers used to capture the effects of sword fighting and Link's movement. Miyamoto initially intended Ocarina of Time to be played in a first-person perspective to enable players to take in the vast terrain of Hyrule Field better and let the team focus more on developing enemies and environments. The concept was abandoned once the idea of a child Link was introduced, and Miyamoto believed it necessary for Link to be visible on screen. Originally Z-targeting involved a generic marker, but Koizumi changed the design to that of a fairy to make it less "robotic". The fairy gained the name of the "Fairy Navigation System" amongst staff, and ultimately, this turned into the nickname "Navi", which in turn resulted in the "birth" of Navi's character. The "birth" of Navi was a pivotal point in the story's development.

Some of Miyamoto's ideas were instead used in Super Mario 64, since it was to be released first. Other ideas were not used due to time constraints. Ocarina of Time originally ran on the same engine as Super Mario 64 but was so heavily modified that Miyamoto considers the final products different engines. One major difference between the two is camera control; the player has a lot of control over the camera in Super Mario 64, but the camera in Ocarina of Time is largely controlled by the game AI. Miyamoto said the camera controls for Ocarina of Time are intended to reflect a focus on the game's world, whereas those of Super Mario 64 are centered on the character of Mario. Miyamoto wanted the difficulty to be easy enough to make the game accessible to all players and said in particular that he wanted it to be easier than Super Mario 64.

Miyamoto wanted to make a game that was cinematic yet distinguished from films. Takumi Kawagoe, who creates cutscenes for Nintendo, said that his priority was to have the player feel in control of the action. To promote this instantaneous continuity of cinematic gameplay, the cutscenes in Ocarina of Time are completely generated with real-time computing on the Nintendo 64 and do not use prerendered full-motion video. Miyamoto's vision required this real-time architecture for the total of more than 90 minutes of cutscenes, regardless of whether the console had a vast medium like CD-ROM on which to store prerendered versions. Toru Osawa created the scenario for the game, based on a story idea by Miyamoto and Yoshiaki Koizumi. He was supported by A Link to the Past and Link's Awakening script writer Kensuke Tanabe. Miyamoto said the real-time rendering engine allowed his small team of 3 to 7 cinematic developers to rapidly adjust the storyline and to focus on developing additional gameplay elements even up to the final few months of development, instead of waiting on a repeated prerendering process. The dungeons were designed by Eiji Aonuma.

Music 
Ocarina of Time music was written by Koji Kondo, the composer in charge of music for most of the games in The Legend of Zelda series. In addition to characters having musical themes, areas of Hyrule are also associated with pieces of music. This has been called leitmotif in reverse—instead of music announcing an entering character, it now introduces a stationary environment as the player approaches. In some locations, the music is a variation of an ocarina tune the player learns, related to that area.

Beyond providing a backdrop for the setting, music plays an integral role in gameplay. The button layout of the Nintendo 64 controller resembles the holes of the ocarinas in the game, and players must learn to play several songs to complete the game. All songs are played using the five notes available on an ocarina, although by bending pitches via the analog stick, players can play additional tones. Kondo said that creating distinct themes on the limited scale was a "major challenge" but feels that the result is very natural. The popularity of Ocarina of Time led to an increase in ocarina sales.

The official soundtrack of Ocarina of Time was published by Pony Canyon and released in Japan on December 18, 1998. It comprises one compact disc with 82 tracks. A U.S. version was also released, although with fewer tracks and different packaging artwork. Many critics praised the music in Ocarina of Time, although IGN was disappointed that the traditional Zelda overworld theme was not included. In 2001, three years after the initial release of Ocarina of Time, GameSpot labeled it as one of the top ten video game soundtracks. The soundtrack, at the time, was not released in Europe or Australia. In 2011, however, a 51-track limited edition soundtrack for the 3DS version was available in a free mail out through a Club Nintendo offer to owners of the 3DS edition, as an incentive to register the product. The original musical theme for the Fire Temple area was altered before release of the game, due to Nintendo's policy of not including real religious references in their products, with the altered theme simply removing the chanting samples.

Hero of Time, an orchestral recording of Ocarina of Times score performed by the Slovak National Symphony Orchestra, was released by video game label Materia Collective in 2017. A vinyl version was published by iam8bit. It was nominated for "Best Game Music Cover/Remix" at the 16th Annual Game Audio Network Guild Awards.

Release 
Ocarina of Time was first shown as a technical and thematic demonstration video at Nintendo's Shoshinkai trade show in December 1995. Nintendo planned to release Super Mario 64 as a launch game for the Nintendo 64 and later release Ocarina of Time for the 64DD, a disk drive peripheral for the system that was still in development. Issues regarding performance of the 64DD peripheral led to development being moved from disk to cartridge media, and thus the game would miss its scheduled 1997 holiday season release and was delayed into 1998. They planned to follow its release with a 64DD expansion disk. Miyamoto additionally attributed the delay to Nintendo prioritizing development efforts to Yoshi's Story after that game missed its planned second quarter release slot.

Throughout the late 1990s, the Nintendo 64 was said to lack hit first-party games. Next Generation wrote that "Nintendo absolutely can't afford another holiday season without a real marquee title" and that Zelda was "one of the most anticipated games of the decade", upon which the Nintendo 64's fate depended. Nintendo spent $10 million on Ocarina of Times marketing. In March 1998, it was the most anticipated Nintendo 64 game in Japan. Chairman Howard Lincoln insisted at E3 1998 that Zelda ship on time and become Nintendo's reinvigorating blockbuster, akin to a hit Hollywood movie.

Customers in North America who pre-ordered the Ocarina of Time received a limited-edition box with a golden plastic card reading "Collector's Edition". This edition contained a gold-colored cartridge, a tradition that began with the original Legend of Zelda (1986) for the Nintendo Entertainment System. Demand was so great that Electronics Boutique stopped pre-selling the game on November 3, 1998.

Several versions of Ocarina of Time were produced, with later revisions featuring minor changes such as glitch repairs, the recoloring of Ganondorf's blood from crimson to green, and the alteration of the music heard in the Fire Temple dungeon to remove a sample of an Islamic prayer chant. The sample was taken from a commercially available sound library, but the developers did not realize it contained Islamic references. Although popularly believed to have been changed due to public outcry, the chanting was removed after Nintendo discovered it violated policy of avoiding religious material, and the altered versions of Ocarina of Time were made prior to the original release.

Rereleases 
Nintendo ported Ocarina of Time to its next console, the GameCube, as part of The Legend of Zelda: Collector's Edition, a compilation of Zelda games. The port runs at a resolution of 640×480, quadruple that of the original, and supports progressive scan. Another GameCube release included the original game and a second, more difficult version titled Master Quest that was included as a pre-order bonus with The Legend of Zelda: The Wind Waker (2002) in Japan and North America and included in GameCube bundles worldwide. It was also given to those who registered certain hardware and software or subscribed to official magazines and clubs. In November 2003, Ocarina of Time was ported to China's iQue Player as one of the five games available on its release.

In February 2007, Ocarina of Time was released for the Wii Virtual Console service for 1000 Wii Points. This version is an emulation of the Nintendo 64 version; as controller vibration is unsupported, the "Stone of Agony" item, which employs vibrations via the Rumble Pak controller accessory, has no function. A five-minute demo of the game can be unlocked in Super Smash Bros. Brawl (2008). Ocarina of Time was rereleased on the Wii U Virtual Console worldwide on July 2, 2015, this time including the original controller vibration. It was also released on the Nintendo Switch Online + Expansion Pack on October 25, 2021.

Nintendo 3DS remake 

In June 2011, Nintendo released Ocarina of Time 3D, an enhanced port for the Nintendo 3DS handheld console. It was developed by Nintendo EAD with Grezzo, an independent Japanese studio headed by Koichi Ishii. The game includes Master Quest and adds features including touchscreen and gyroscope controls, a "Boss Challenge" mode, instructional videos to guide stuck players, and a modified version of the Water Temple with reduced difficulty.

Master Quest
After completing Ocarina of Time, Nintendo developed a new version of the game for the then-unreleased 64DD peripheral with the working title Ura Zelda, commonly translated as "Another Zelda". Described as a second version of Ocarina with rearranged dungeons, it contains new content, some that had been cut from Ocarina due to time and storage constraints. In 1998, Ura Zelda was delayed indefinitely following problems with the development of the 64DD, and was canceled due to the 64DD's commercial failure. In August 2000, Miyamoto stated that Ura Zelda had been finished and that no online functions had ever been planned.

According to Miyamoto, Ura Zelda was simple to port as it used few of the 64DD features. Master Quest uses the same engine and plot of Ocarina of Time but with increased difficulty and altered dungeons and puzzles.

IGN's Peer Schneider gave Master Quest a mostly positive review, likening the concept to the second quest of the original Legend of Zelda. He said that some redesigned areas were poorer than the original Ocarina of Time and speculated that they may have been constructed from "second choice" designs created during development. He described the port as graphically improved but containing no substantial improvement to the frame rate. He also expressed that controls translated to the GameCube controller felt clumsy. Nonetheless, he summarized Master Quest as a "sweet surprise for any Zelda fan" and wrote that he would have recommended it even at full price. Zachary Lewis of RPG Gamer praised the revised puzzles, which require precise timing and find new uses for the Ocarina items, but wrote that players would be enthralled or frustrated by the increased difficulty.

Reception 

Upon its initial Nintendo 64 release, Ocarina of Time received critical acclaim. It garnered perfect review scores from the majority of gaming publications that reviewed it, including Famitsu, Next Generation, Edge, Electronic Gaming Monthly, GameSpot, and IGN. The review aggregator websites Metacritic and GameRankings rank the original Nintendo 64 version as the highest and second-highest reviewed game of all time, respectively, with average scores of 99/100 from Metacritic and 98% from GameRankings. The reviews praised multiple aspects of the game, particularly its level design, gameplay mechanics, sound, and cinematics. GameSpot reviewer Jeff Gerstmann wrote that Ocarina of Time is "a game that can't be called anything other than flawless", and IGN called it "the new benchmark for interactive entertainment" that could "shape the action RPG genre for years to come". Editors of GameTrailers called it a "walking patent office" due to the number of features it contains that became "industry standard".

The graphics were praised for their depth and detail, although reviewers noted they were not always the best the console had to offer. Game Revolution noted the characters' faces, the "toughest graphical challenge on 3D characters", saying that the characters' expressions and animation featured "surprising grace". IGN believed that Ocarina of Time improved on the graphics of Super Mario 64, giving a larger sense of scale. Impressive draw distances and large boss characters were also mentioned as graphical highlights. Although excelling in the use of color and the visibility and detail of the environment, reviewers noted that some graphical elements of Ocarina of Time did not perform as well as Banjo-Kazooie, a game released for the same platform earlier that year. IGN said that the frame rate and textures of Ocarina of Time were not as good as those of Banjo-Kazooie, particularly in the marketplace of Hyrule Castle, which was called "blurry".

Gameplay was generally praised as detailed, with many side quests to occupy players' time. IGN said players would be "amazed at the detail" of the environment and the "amount of thought that went into designing it". IGN praised the cinematics, citing great emotional impact and "flawless camera work". EGM enjoyed that Nintendo was able to take the elements of the older, 2D Zelda games and "translate it all into 3D flawlessly". Nintendo Power cited Ocarina of Time, along with Super Mario 64, as two games that "blazed trails" into the 3D era. The context-sensitive control system was seen as one of the strongest elements of the gameplay. Reviewers noted that it allowed for simpler control using fewer buttons but that it occasionally caused the player to perform unintended actions. The camera control was quoted as making combat "second nature", although the new system took time for the player to get used to.

The game's audio was generally well received, with IGN comparing some of Koji Kondo's pieces to the work of Philip Glass. Many atmospheric sounds and surround sound were designed to effectively immerse the player in the game world. Some reviewers complained that the audio samples used in the game sounded dated; others considered this a benefit, calling them "retro". Game Revolution called the sound "good for the Nintendo, but not great in the larger scheme of things" and noted that the cartridge format necessitated "MIDI tunes that range from fair to terrible". Pitchfork gave the official soundtrack album a 9 out of 10.

Sales 
Assisted by a large marketing campaign, Ocarina of Time was a strong commercial success. In the United States, over 500,000 pre-orders were placed, more than tripling the number of pre-orders for any previous video game, for which it was awarded the Guinness World Record for Most Advance Orders for a Game. Upon release, more than 1 million copies were sold there in less than a week. In 1998, 2.5 million copies were sold, although it was released only 39 days before the end of the year; it earned  in U.S. revenues, higher than any Hollywood film in the last six weeks of 1998. It was the best-selling video game of 1998 in the United States. In Japan, 920,000 copies were sold in 1998, becoming the eighth best-selling game of that year; a reported 386,234 copies were sold in its first week there, surpassing the 316,000 first-week sales of Metal Gear Solid.

In Europe, it was the fifth best-selling game of 1998 with over €39,000,000 or  grossed that year. In the United Kingdom, 61,232 copies were sold during its first weekend, becoming the UK's fastest-selling title up until it was surpassed by Gran Turismo 2 in 2000. By 2000, Ocarina of Time had sold  cartridges and grossed about  worldwide. During its lifetime, Ocarina of Time for the Nintendo 64 saw 1.14 million copies sold in Japan, and 7.6 million copies worldwide.

Awards 
In 1998, Ocarina of Time won the Grand Prize in the Interactive Art division at the Japan Media Arts Festival. It won six honors at the 2nd Annual Interactive Achievement Awards, including "Game of the Year", "Outstanding Achievement in Interactive Design", "Outstanding Achievement in Software Engineering", "Console Game of the Year", "Console Adventure Game of the Year" and "Console Role-Playing Game of the Year", along with a nomination for "Outstanding Achievement in Character or Story Development". Electronic Gaming Monthly gave it both the editors' choice and readers' choice awards for "Game of the Year for All Systems", "Nintendo 64 Game of the Year" and "Action RPG of the Year" as well as the readers' choice awards for "Best Music" and "Best Graphics", and it was runner-up for the reader's choice "Best Sound Effects" award. Edge gave it the awards for "Game of the Year" and "Gameplay Innovation" and placed it 2nd place for "Graphical Achievement" (behind Virtua Fighter 3tb).

Legacy 

After publication, Ocarina of Time was featured on a number of compiled lists of best or most influential games. It was ranked the greatest video game of all time by numerous publications including Computer and Video Games, Edge, Entertainment Weekly, GameTrailers, IGN, Next Generation, Nintendo Power, Game Informer, Slant, FHM, and PALGN. It also appeared on other lists of greatest games including those of Electronic Gaming Monthly and IGN. The game was placed second in Official Nintendo Magazines "100 greatest Nintendo games of all time", behind only Super Mario Bros. Game Informer ranked it as its 11th favorite game of all time and described it as "untouchable". In May 2011, IGN held a tournament-style competition celebrating the 25th anniversary of the original The Legend of Zeldas release in which fans voted Ocarina of Time the greatest Zelda game; it beat Majora's Mask in the final round. Ocarina of Time has consistently been placed at number one in Edges "top 100 games" lists: a staff-voted list in January 2000, a staff- and reader-voted list in July 2007, a list of "The 100 Best Games to Play Today" in March 2009, and a 2013 readers' poll selecting the 20 best games released since the magazine's launch in 1993. Edge concluded its 2009 list with: "Ocarina of Time is here in the list not because Nintendo had the power and wisdom to make a great game, but because it had the courage to make a unique one". In 2022, The Strong National Museum of Play inducted Ocarina of Time to its World Video Game Hall of Fame.

Reception for the Master Quest and Virtual Console rereleases was positive; while some considered aspects of the graphics and audio to be outdated, most thought that the game had aged well. The Master Quest version holds an average score of 89.50% on GameRankings and 91/100 on Metacritic. IGN said in their review that "Ocarina of Time has aged extremely well", and noted in regard to the game's graphics, while the textures and models look dated, the game's visual presentation stood the test of time. Game Revolution said that although the game has "noticeably aged compared to brand new RPGs ... it's still a terrific game", awarding 91 out of 100. In 2007, former GameSpot editor Jeff Gerstmann gave the Virtual Console port 8.9 out of 10: "Even after nine years, Ocarina of Time holds up surprisingly well, offering a lengthy and often-amazing adventure".

In November 2021, enthusiasts fully decompiled the ROM into human-readable C code. In January 2022, a group called "Harbour Masters" announced that their PC port was 90% complete. The port was later publicly released in March.

Impact
The Legend of Zelda: Ocarina of Times gameplay system popularized features such as a target lock system and context-sensitive buttons that have since become common elements in 3D adventure games.

Multiple members of the video game industry have expressed how the game impacted them and the industry. Former Rockstar Games vice president of creativity Dan Houser stated in 2012 that "anyone who makes 3-D games who says they've not borrowed something from Mario or Zelda [on the Nintendo 64] is lying". Rockstar founder and Grand Theft Auto director Sam Houser also cited the game's influence, describing Grand Theft Auto III as "Zelda meets Goodfellas". Ōkami director Hideki Kamiya (Capcom, PlatinumGames) said that he had been influenced by Zelda when he developed Okami. Soul Reaver and Uncharted director, Amy Hennig (Crystal Dynamics and Naughty Dog), cited Zelda as an influence for the Legacy of Kain series, noting Ocarina of Times influence on Soul Reaver.

Dark Souls creator Hidetaka Miyazaki (FromSoftware) said that "The Legend of Zelda became a sort of textbook for 3D action games". Ico director Fumito Ueda (Team Ico) cited Zelda as an influence on Shadow of the Colossus. Darksiders director David Adams (Vigil Games) cited Zelda as an influence on his work. CD Projekt Red (The Witcher, Cyberpunk 2077) cited Zelda as an influence on The Witcher series, including The Witcher 3: Wild Hunt (2015). Final Fantasy and The 3rd Birthday director Hajime Tabata (Square Enix) cited Ocarina of Time as inspiration for the seamless open world of Final Fantasy XV.

Notes

References

External links 

 
 

1998 video games
Action-adventure games
AIAS Game of the Year winners
Cancelled 64DD games
GameCube games
Interactive Achievement Award winners
IQue games
Nintendo 64 games
Nintendo Entertainment Analysis and Development games
Open-world video games
Single-player video games
Ocarina of Time
Video games about time travel
Video games developed in Japan
Video games directed by Shigeru Miyamoto
Video games produced by Shigeru Miyamoto
Video games scored by Koji Kondo
Video games with alternative versions
Virtual Console games for Wii
Virtual Console games for Wii U
Nintendo Switch Online games
BAFTA Interactive Entertainment Award for Best Games winners
Japan Game Awards' Game of the Year winners
VSDA Game of the Year winners
World Video Game Hall of Fame
Fiction about time travel
Video games with time manipulation
D.I.C.E. Award for Adventure Game of the Year winners
D.I.C.E. Award for Role-Playing Game of the Year winners